The 2009 Rally Ireland, officially 2nd Rally Ireland, was the first round of the 2009 World Rally Championship season and was held between 30 January and 1 February 2009, it was also the opening round of the Junior World Rally Championship this season. Sligo was once again the rally base with the special stages being held on agricultural tarmac roads and major tarmac roads in the north west of Northern Ireland and the Republic of Ireland.

Introduction

The rally returned after a year's absence as to hold the opening round of the World Rally Championship after the Monte Carlo Rally was absent on the year's calendar due to the FIA's Round Rotation calendar system. This happens every two years, so the rally was out for 2010 in favour of Monte Carlo resuming its traditional place as the season opener, but returned in 2011 in the same position.

World Rally Championship

During Friday, heavy rain dominated the weekend and drivers found it difficult to compete in this kind of torrential weather, also mud became a feature, especially on broken tarmac roads. But Sébastien Loeb took the win second time in the row with Dani Sordo sealing a Citroën 1–2, two events in succession since the inaugural Rally Ireland held in 2007. Mikko Hirvonen once again settled for third place against the Citroën's tarmac wizards, with 2:07.8 minutes behind Loeb. Norway's Henning Solberg was the only of the Solberg brothers present after the no-show of 2003 WRC Champion Petter Solberg. He finished fourth, his best result on tarmac, but he was almost beaten by Citroën's newbie Chris Atkinson who finished in fifth overall despite some big scary moments, including hitting a telegraph pole on Leg 1 and spinning on Stage 18. Sébastien Ogier finished in sixth ahead of Matthew Wilson in a tight battle, while Khalid al-Qassimi became the first Arab rally driver since 1993 by compatriot Mohammed Bin Sulayem. But some drivers such as Jari Matti Latvala, who leads after Stage 1 broke his drive shaft after a puncture on two wheels, Ford's new driver Urmo Aava who leads after Stages 2 and 3, slid off the road and crashing without heavy impact at the Aughnasheelan Stage 6, and Conrad Rautenbach slid off at Stage 9 at Sloughan Glen and got his Citroën C4 deeply stuck at the mud, were all able to restart under the SuperRally rules to finish 10th by Aava, 14th by Latvala, and Rautenbach crossed the line in 18th place, and all of them score manufacturer's points for their respective teams.

Junior World Rally Championship

The JWRC drivers suffered in this torrential weather as well in the rally during the course of the weekend as eight JWRC drivers competed. Aaron Burkart who switch from his longtime associates Citroën to Suzuki this year was confident of the decision, just won his first JWRC rally in his debut with the team, ahead of the Czech driver Martin Prokop, unlike Burkart stayed with Citroën. While a distant third place for Italian Suzuki driver Simone Bertolotti, who previously drove for Renault. But worst thing happened that Dutchman Hans Weijs jr. who crash heavily at Stage 14 at Tempo under heavy rain that cause to stop some times by rally drivers such as Yoann Bonato and countryman Kevin Abbring, both had activated the SuperRally rules after retiring at Leg 1, had to start their runs all over again because of the incident, but both he and his co-driver were uninjured and  the car was not badly damaged.

Results

Special stages

Championship standings after the event

Drivers' championship

Manufacturers' championship

References

External links 
  at official page WRC.com

Ireland
2009
Rally